The 2013 The All-Japan Rugby Football Championship (日本ラグビーフットボール選手権大会 Nihon Ragubi-Futtobo-ru Senshuken Taikai) took place from Feb 2nd up to the final on Feb 24th.

Qualifying

Top League
The top four teams (Suntory Sungoliath, Toshiba Brave Lupus, Panasonic Wild Knights, Kobelco Steelers) in the 2012–13 Top League automatically qualified for the competition, and competed in a playoff competition.

Toshiba Brave Lupus and Suntory Sungoliath eventually played in the Final, with Suntory Sungoliath winning 19–3. As Top League finalists they gained automatic entry to the Championship Semi-finals.

The Top League Wildcard Tournament was contested by the fifth to tenth teams in the final table for the last two places for this league in the Championship. This was competed by Toyota Verblitz, Yamaha Júbilo, Kintetsu Liners, NEC Green Rockets, NTT Communications Shining Arcs and Ricoh Black Rams and eventually taken by Toyota Verblitz and Yamaha Júbilo.

Top Challenge One 
In the 2012–13 Challenge series, the teams from Top Challenge One (Kubota Spears, Toyota Industries Shuttles, Coca-Cola West Red Sparks) and Mitsubishi Sagamihara DynaBoars (Top Challenge Two Winner) competed over 3 rounds to gain the first place (as Top Challenger One) for qualification to the Championship. This was eventually won by the Coca-Cola West Red Sparks.

University 
In the 49th Japan National University Rugby Championship final Teikyo University defeated Tsukuba University 39-22. Both teams gained entry to the Championship as finalists.

Club 
In the 20th All Japan Rugby Club Championship, Rokko Fighting Bull gained the Top Club side entry to the Championship.

Qualifying Teams 

 Top League Playoff Finalists - Suntory Sungoliath, Toshiba Brave Lupus
 Top League Playoff Semi-Finalists - Panasonic Wild Knights, Kobelco Steelers
 Top League Wild Card Playoff - Toyota Verblitz, Yamaha Júbilo
 All Japan University Rugby Championship - Teikyo University, Tsukuba University
 All Japan Rugby Club Championship - Rokko Fighting Bull
 Top Challenge Series - Coca-Cola West Red Sparks

Knockout stages

First round

Quarter-final

Semi-final 

Suntory Sungoliath and Toshiba Brave Lupus bypassed the first two rounds into the semi-finals by reaching the final of the Top League playoffs in 2013.

Final

See also 
 Rugby Union in Japan

References

External links 
 Official JRFU Scores and Details (Japanese)

2012–13 in Japanese rugby union
All-Japan Rugby Football Championship